Gowmazi or Gumazi may refer to:
 Gowmazi Faqir
 Gowmazi Jari
 Gowmazi Kowsar
 Gowmazi Osman
 Gowmazi Saleh
 Gowmazi Sanjar